The Latvia men's national under-20 basketball team is the national representative for Latvia in international under-20 basketball competitions. They are organized and run by the Latvian Basketball Association.

FIBA U20 European Championship participations

See also
Latvia men's national basketball team
Latvia men's national under-19 basketball team
Latvia women's national under-20 basketball team

References

External links
Official website 
Archived records of Latvia team participations

National sports teams of Latvia
M U20
Men's national under-20 basketball teams